The Imperial German Army  Zeppelin LZ 43 (L 12) was a P-class World War I zeppelin. While taking part in a bombing raid of the United Kingdom the Airship was hit by AA fire and it crashed outside of Ostend, Belgium on 10 August 1915. While being towed into the harbour, it burst into fire.

Operational history

It took part in five reconnaissance missions.

Destruction

While commanded by Oberleutnant-zur-See Werner Peterson, on 9 August 1915, it took part in a Raid on the United Kingdom with L 10, L 11, and L 13 (L 13 turned back early with engine problems). The Airship was blown off course and took heavy fire while flying over Dover. It dropped 10 bombs, allowing it to rise above the AA fire. Of the 10 bombs only four hit land, two struck the parapet of Admiralty Pier, and a third hit its Transport Office. The fourth bomb fell under the bows of the trawler Equinox, wounding three.

L 12 didn't escape bombing Dover with taking damage and starting leaking hydrogen. It crashed into the sea a few miles out from Ostend. Torpedo boats towed her into harbour but she burst into flames while being hauled out onto the dock.

Specifications

See also

List of Zeppelins

Bibliography

Notes

References

Further reading

 

Airships of Germany
Hydrogen airships
Zeppelins
Aviation accidents and incidents in 1916
Accidents and incidents involving balloons and airships